Mikhail Petrov may refer to:

 Mikhail Petrov (general) (1898-1941), Soviet Red Army general
 Mikhail Petrov (colonel) (1904-1967), Soviet Army coronel and Hero of the Soviet Union
 Mikhail Petrov (rower) (born 1958), Bulgarian rower
 Mikhail Petrov (weightlifter) (1965-1993), Bulgarian weightlifter

See also
 Mikhail Petrovo-Solovovo (1868–1954), Soviet Russian diplomat and psychical researcher